Henricus Antonius Wilhelmus "Harry" van der Meer (born October 30, 1973 in Veenendaal) is a former water polo forward from the Netherlands, who participated in three Summer Olympics. From 1992 on he finished in ninth (Barcelona), tenth (Atlanta, Georgia) and eleventh (Sydney) position with the National Men's Team. Now, he is a coach.

See also
 Netherlands men's Olympic water polo team records and statistics
 List of men's Olympic water polo tournament top goalscorers

References
 Dutch Olympic Committee

External links
 

1973 births
Living people
Dutch male water polo players
Olympic water polo players of the Netherlands
People from Veenendaal
Water polo players at the 1992 Summer Olympics
Water polo players at the 1996 Summer Olympics
Water polo players at the 2000 Summer Olympics
Sportspeople from Utrecht (province)
20th-century Dutch people